Charge is an album by Trinidadian soca artist Machel Montano and his band Xtatik released in 1998.

Track listing
 "Mad Bull Intro"
 "Toro Toro (Original)"
 "Xtatik Prayer (Interlude)"
 "Stand Up" - (featuring Andre Tanker)
 "Footsteps"
 "Feeling 2 Fete"
 "Jeunes Agape (Interlude)"
 "Set My Music Free"
 "Trumpet Man"
 "Pump D Iron"
 "Harry Krishna"
 "Vendors"
 "Daddy Axe"
 "We Like It" - (featuring Lord Nelson)
 "Rag Singers (Interlude)"
 "Lonely Rag"
 "Mad Bull Body" - (featuring Breeze)
 "Hard Working Dog"
 "Toro Toro (Remix)" - (featuring Shaggy)

1998 albums
Machel Montano albums